The William Penn School District is a large suburban, public school district located in Delaware County, Pennsylvania. It comprises eight elementary schools, one middle school, one alternative school, and one high school, based on two campuses. The district serves the boroughs of Aldan, Colwyn, Darby, East Lansdowne, Lansdowne, and Yeadon. The district is adjacent to the City of Philadelphia. The total enrollment is about 5,610. The district encompasses approximately 5 square miles. According to 2000 local census data, it serves a resident population of 42,457.The district administration offices are located at 100 Green Avenue – Annex Lansdowne, PA 19050.

The district was created in 1972 from the consolidation of smaller, local districts by state mandate that they merge and desegregate their schools.

Schools

High schools
 Penn Wood High School – occupies Cypress Street Campus (grade 9) (Yeadon) and Green Avenue Campus (grades 10–12) (Lansdowne). The William Penn School District also offers: the Twilight School which is a computer based credit recovery program; Customized, accelerated learning options through the Blended Schools program; and an alternative to the traditional brick-and-mortar school setting through the William Penn School District Cyber Academy.

Middle school
 Penn Wood Middle School (grades 7–8) (Darby)

Primary schools
 Aldan Elementary School (K–6) (Aldan)
 Ardmore Avenue Elementary School (K–6) (Lansdowne)
 Bell Avenue Elementary School (K–6) (Yeadon)
 Colwyn Elementary School (K–6) (Colwyn)
 East Lansdowne Elementary School (K–6) (East Lansdowne)
 Evans Elementary School (K–6) (Yeadon)
 Park Lane Elementary School (K–6) (Darby)
 Walnut Street Elementary School (K–6) (was K-8 in years 2006–08 but went back to K-6)(Darby)

Alternative school
 Ombudsman

See also 

 William Penn School District v. Pennsylvania Department of Education

References

External links
 Official site
 Delaware County Tech Schools career and technical education
 Delaware County Intermediate Unit #25
 

School districts established in 1972
School districts in Delaware County, Pennsylvania
1972 establishments in Pennsylvania
Lansdowne, Pennsylvania